Thomas Hiram Andrews (born March 22, 1953) is an American non-profit executive, and a former Democratic Party politician from Maine.

Biography 
A 1976 graduate of Bowdoin College and alumnus of the Alpha Rho Upsilon fraternity, Andrews served in the Maine House of Representatives (1983–1985) and Maine State Senate (1985–1990) before being elected to two terms in the U.S. House of Representatives.

In his first congressional election, Andrews defeated the former Congressman Dave Emery in the race to succeed Democrat Joe Brennan. In his only re-election, Andrews soundly defeated Linda Bean, a descendant of L. L. Bean.

In 1994, he did not run for re-election to the House but declared his candidacy for the U.S. Senate seat being vacated by the retiring Democrat George J. Mitchell, then the Senate Majority Leader. Andrews lost the Senate election to his 2nd District colleague, Republican Olympia Snowe, by a wide margin.

Andrews served as National Director of Win Without War. He has served on the boards of Council for a Livable World's PeacePAC (as Chairman), and the U.S. foreign policy reform group Just Foreign Policy.

In 2016, he became the CEO of the Unitarian Universalist Service Committee.

In 2020, Andrews was appointed  a United Nations Special Rapporteur on the situation of human rights in Myanmar by the United Nations Human Rights Council.

References

External links 

 

1953 births
Living people
Bowdoin College alumni
Democratic Party members of the Maine House of Representatives
Democratic Party Maine state senators
Politicians from Brockton, Massachusetts
Democratic Party members of the United States House of Representatives from Maine
Unitarian Universalists